John O' Brennan is an Irish political scientist. He is Professor of European Politics at the Department of Sociology at Maynooth University, Ireland.  He is a specialist in EU Enlargement policy and also publishes on Ireland’s relationship with the European Union. O’ Brennan also holds the Jean Monnet Chair in European Integration at Maynooth University  and is Director of the Maynooth University Centre for European and Eurasian Studies.  The Centre is Ireland’s only dedicated academic unit specialising in research on Central and Eastern Europe and Eurasia. From 2020 to 2023 it was a designated Jean Monnet Centre of Excellence, with a focus on governance in South-eastern Europe, including EU Enlargement issues, rule of law and EU relations with the Western Balkans and Ukraine.

Education and career 
O’ Brennan graduated with first class honours from the University of Limerick and was subsequently the recipient of Irish Research Council awards for both his doctoral and post-doctoral work on EU enlargement (1998 and 2004). He worked at Varna University of Economics (2000-01) as lecturer in European and international politics  and was a visiting fellow with the Open Society’s Civic Education Programme. He was also a visiting researcher at the European Union Institute for Security Studies in Paris in 2005.  From 2001 to 2004, and again in 2006-2007, O’ Brennan worked as a lecturer in the Department of Politics and Administration at the University of Limerick.  In 2007 he was appointed Lecturer in European Politics and Society at Maynooth University. In his career at Maynooth he has taught courses on Comparative European Politics, European Union Politics and Policy-making ,and International Relations.  He also leads regular Maynooth University fieldtrips to Brussels where MU students engage with the European Commission, Council of Ministers, MEPs and other entities.

Brexit, Ireland and the European Union 
O’ Brennan is a leading authority on Brexit and was appointed by the Irish government in 2017 as a member of the Brexit Stakeholder Group, which was convened by the Irish Minister for Foreign Affairs to provide advice to the Irish government on the Article 50 negotiations between the European Union and United Kingdom.  He was a frequent expert contributor to radio and television discussions of Brexit after 2016, on RTE, UTV, SKY News, Al Jazeera, Bloomberg, Newstalk, Today FM and many other outlets.  His research centre at Maynooth, the Centre for European and Eurasian Studies, hosted a number of major public events on Brexit, including an interview with leading commentator Fintan O’ Toole of The Irish Times  and discussions at different stages of the Brexit negotiations. 

O’ Brennan hosted Former BBC Newsnight anchor Gavin Esler in a discussion of his book, How Britain Ends: English nationalism and the rebirth of four nations in 2021, with responses to Esler’s book from Professor Brigid Laffan (European University Institute) and Professor Colin Coulter (Maynooth University).  Link to video O’ Brennan was the main interviewee for a project devoted to explaining Brexit to high school students in Ireland.  In 2021 he had a memorable encounter with the bruising Conservative MP, Andrew Bridgen, on Today with Claire Byrne on RTE Radio One, discussing the row between the EU and UK about vaccine distribution and supply.

O’ Brennan has lectured widely on the European Union, including at leading international centres of excellence. In 2019 he undertook a lecture tour on Brexit which took in the University of Ljubljana (Slovenia), Rijeka University (Croatia), and the University of Trieste (Italy). He also delivered a lecture on Ireland and Brexit at the Institute of European Studies at the University of California at Berkeley in May 2019.  In 2022-23, he delivered a series of lectures examining Ireland’s experience of 50 years of EU membership at Dublin City University’s EU Academy conference, the University of Bucharest, and Sofia University, and the University of Georgia, among others.

O’Brennan is perceived as a champion of European integration but is frequently critical of the EU. He was deeply critical of EU policy during the Eurozone crisis after 2008. He has been especially vocal in criticising the EU’s inadequate approach to rule of law violations within the EU and the failures in EU policy towards the Western Balkan states. 

He was also a participant in the Conference hosted by the Irish Department of Foreign Affairs on 27 October 2022, along with Martin Sandbu of the Financial Times and Mairead McGuinness, EU Commissioner for Financial Services, Financial Stability and the Capital Markets Union.  O’ Brennan has been a frequent contributor to Ireland’s leading intellectual fora, including the Killarney Economic Conference, the McGill Summer School and the Royal Irish Academy.  Internationally, he has lectured at the University of Cyprus, Glasgow University, Reykjavik University, Leicester University, Leiden University, Marburg University, Surrey University. 

O’ Brennan was a notable critic of the Trump administration and did a number of radio and television shows criticising the community in Doonbeg, County Clare, (where the Trump organisation owns a golf course) for welcoming the Trump family into their midst. There was voluble criticism of O’ Brennan within the Doonbeg community.

EU treaty debates 
O’ Brennan was active in the debates surrounding ratification of the Nice and Lisbon treaties in Ireland (2001-2002 and 2008-2009), as well as the 2012 Fiscal Treaty, contributing opinion pieces, journal articles and think tank policy papers to these discussions.

Affiliations 

O’ Brennan is a member and regular participant in events hosted by the University Association for Contemporary European Studies (UACES), the European Union Studies Association (EUSA), the American Conference for Irish Studies (ACIS) and many other international scholarly associations.

O’ Brennan has been a frequent witness before parliamentary committees on issues connected to Brexit, European integration and international relations.  On 7 December 2022 he testified before the Oireachtas European Affairs Committee on how to help with recruitment of Irish people to the EU institutions and better communicate what the European Union does in Ireland. He has been a witness before the UK House of Lords Committees on several occasions.

O’ Brennan is Vice-President of the Irish Association for Contemporary European Studies (IACES), and in this capacity has hosted or co-hosted speeches by the President of Ireland, Michael D. Higgins, Mary Lou MacDonald, President, Sinn Fein, Michael Russell, Cabinet Secretary to the Scottish Government and many other prominent figures from politics and diplomacy.

O’ Brennan was Secretary and a board member of the Political Studies Association of Ireland (PSAI) and co-organised the PSAI Annual Conference at Maynooth University in 2019.He is also a member of the Irish Institute for International and European Affairs (IIEA) ‘Future of Europe’ group and a past member of the International Affairs Committee of the Royal Irish Academy .

He is also a past Chairman of the Political Science section of the Global Undergraduate Awards, which adjudicates on the best undergraduate work submitted in the world’s leading universities.

Scholarly work 
O’ Brennan’s scholarly work can be divided into two parts. The first engages with EU Enlargement policy. He is the author of The Eastern Enlargement of the European Union (Routledge, 2006, 2009) and National Parliaments within the Enlarged European Union: from ‘victims’ of integration to competitive actors? (Routledge, with Tapio Raunio, 2007).

In early 2022, he published a widely read critique of Vladimir Putin in the Dublin Review of Books. In the essay he traces the development and evolution of Putin’s sociopathic violence which culminated in the shocking attack on Ukraine on 24 February 2022.

The second tranche of O’ Brennan’s published work focuses on Ireland’s relationship with the EU. O’ Brennan has published numerous journal articles on this theme and is the editor of two special issues of Irish Political Studies (with Mary C. Murphy, UCC) and Administration on Ireland and European integration. An earlier essay focused on Ireland’s struggle to be accepted as a member of the EU in the 1960s and early 1970s. Murphy and O’ Brennan frequently collaborate on opinion pieces about Ireland and the EU. In advance of the 2016 Brexit referendum in the United Kingdom they argued that the UK could learn a lot from the Irish experience of holding regular referendums on EU constitutional issues. They contributed to a landmark episode of Talking History on Newstalk FM in late 2022 which focused on Ireland’s five decades of membership of the EU.

O’ Brennan has been a frequent critic of the complacency of much of Ireland’s political class on European Union issues.

O’ Brennan is the co-author (with Dr. Barry Colfer, IIEA) of the Ireland report in the Bertelsman Stiftung’s annual analysis of the Sustainable Development Goals (SDGs) and the 2021 report on Ireland’s management of the Covid-19 crisis.

O’ Brennan has worked as an evaluator for national and international bodies including the National University of Ireland’s Travelling PhD Scholarship, the European Union’s Horizon 2020 programme and other international funding agencies.

O’ Brennan spends a great deal of time in Central and Eastern Europe and writes frequently about South-eastern Europe, the Western Balkans and Ukraine. He has spent long periods living and working in Bulgaria and has written many pieces of commentary on Bulgaria’s political landscape and relationship with the EU. 

He was a vocal critic of the obstruction of free movement for Bulgarian and Romanian citizens within the EU.

He is a regular contributor to Carnegie Europe’s ;Judy Asks’ series, which invites thought leaders around Europe to contribute to regular discussion of contemporary issues.

References

Year of birth missing (living people)
Living people
Irish political scientists
Academics of Maynooth University
Alumni of the University of Limerick